WMG may refer to:

Warner Music Group
WMG, University of Warwick, United Kingdom
Washington Marine Group
Wave Motion Gun (波動砲 hadō hō), the main weapon of the fictional Space Battleship Yamato
Welham Green railway station, Hertfordshire, England (National Rail station code)